The Yamaha OX66 is a four-stroke, naturally-aspirated, 30-valve (five-valves per cylinder), V6 racing engine, designed, developed and built by Japanese manufacturer Yamaha, in 1984.

Development history and background
Yamaha Motor started development around 1980 as an engine development that leads to high performance. As a design concept,

1. High performance
2. Easy maintenance
3. Lightweight and compact
4. Wide power band
And so on.

In order to realize the above design concept, if F2 is a high-speed, high-performance engine, it was implemented as a project because it can be used in actual battles in domestic development.

At the time of development, both BMW (in-line 4-cylinder) and Honda (V-type 6-cylinder) provided engines for F2, but Honda has achieved good results with high output with the V6 engine ( Honda RA264E ) despite limited supply. Therefore, the development proceeded to have an advantage over Honda.

Participation in the race was carried out in partnership with Ken Matsuura Racing Service. The Fédération Internationale de l'Automobile (FIA) changed the category directly under F1 to Formula 3000 (F3000) in 1985, but the Japan Automobile Federation (JAF) announced that it will continue F2 for four years, so Yamaha announced the development of OX66. Then I decided to supply it to the market.

Performance / technical specifications
V6 engine, DOHC, 5 valve, naturally-aspirated, 
Bank angle: 75 degrees
Inner diameter X stroke:  x 
Maximum output: 330ps / 11000rpm
Maximum torque:  @ 9000rpm
Weight: 
Fuel injection device: Electronically controlled fuel injection

Engine overview

Cylinder block
In the racing engine V6 engine, compactness is prioritized over torque fluctuations in non-equidistant explosions.

Yamaha emphasized compactness rather than Honda, and set the bank angle to the angle bank angle (75 degrees). In order to reduce the weight at the same time as making it compact, the cylinder block is cast from aluminum and the cam drive is made into a belt to thoroughly reduce the weight.

A cast-iron wet liner is inserted into the aluminum block to prevent the deformation of the block from being directly transmitted to the inner surface of the cylinder. In addition, by using a wet liner, if the cylinder wears, only the wet liner needs to be replaced, achieving the goal of easy maintenance.

Belt drive
A belt drive is also used to drive the cam, achieving weight reduction, compactness, and easy maintenance.

In the engine, a gasket is sandwiched between the cylinder block and the head, and the head is tightened to a specified torque, but the thickness of the gasket does not reach a certain thickness after tightening. Therefore, in gear drive, after tightening the head to the block, it is necessary to select and attach several sets of gears with different backlash prepared. If the backlash is too large, the gear train will vibrate and the gear may be damaged.

With a belt-drive, such adjustments are not necessary, and it is possible to deal with it simply by applying appropriate tension to the belt with a tensioner.

In a normal belt drive, the crankshaft and camshaft are directly connected and decelerated to 1/2 in the belt drive to drive, but in OX66, once decelerated to 1/2 with gear, one pair is driven by separate belts for the left and right banks at a speed ratio of 1. This is to make the cam side pulley compact. The pulley diameter is determined by the small-diameter side pulley in relation to the bending fatigue of the belt and the number of meshing ridges.

In normal direct drive, the diameter of the pulley on the cam side is double the diameter of the pulley on the crankshaft side, which inevitably results in a large pulley. Therefore, he said that the OX66 decelerates in advance with gears, reduces the diameter of the cam side pulley, and narrows the overall width of the engine.

The OX66 uses two idle pulleys and one tension pulley in one bank, and the water pumps in the left and right banks and the oil pumps in the left bank are also driven by belts.

Using an idle pulley (idler) is a method of increasing the number of meshing ridges of the pulley to reduce the shear stress of the ridges, but on the other hand, it also has the disadvantage of promoting bending fatigue of the core body.

All the main auxiliary equipment is simply put together at the front end of the engine with a drive system by belt drive, which contributes to shortening the overall length of the engine.

Engine control
At the time of the announcement of the OX66 and in the 1985 season, the fuel supply system and ignition also adopted electronic control.

The fuel supply system uses electronically controlled fuel injection (EFI) manufactured by Nihon Denso. The basic format is the speed density method, which is a correction based on the throttle valve opening and incorporates a correction using an air temperature sensor and an engine speed sensor. Initially, the injector was installed directly above the intake pipe and attached directly to the delivery pipe, but it was changed to a method in which it was attached to the side of the intake pipe and the V bank pipe was connected from the delivery pipe with a rubber hose.

The ignition also adopted electronic control in accordance with the fuel injection. A pulse generator is installed at the rear end of the intake-side camshaft to notify the igniter of the ignition timing. One igniter is installed in each bank and six coils are installed in the bank to distribute power.

In the mass production specifications of 1986, the fuel injection was changed to Bosch's mechanical type. It was adopted because Bosch's mechanical fuel injection is easier to adjust. In mechanical fuel injection, Bosch has one more control element than Lucas (later TRW → ZF ), and the injection amount can be controlled more accurately. Volumetric efficiency varies depending on the engine speed, but Bosch can be controlled according to it, but Lucas cannot.

Since the fuel injection pump was installed in the V bank, the six coils that had been installed so far could not fit. Therefore, he reduced the number of coils to one bank and changed to a method of distributing power with a distributor. The fuel injection pump is driven by a belt by the intake side camshaft of the left bank, and the shaft is extended to the rear of the V bank.

Five-valve
It uses five valves with three intake valves and two exhaust valves per cylinder. Yamaha has already used a five-valve on a large motorcycle so that technology was diverted to the OX66.

Honda adopted a φ90X52.3mm and ultra-short stroke (big bore) to increase the valve area with four valves, so the　combustion chamber became flat and combustion was not stable in the extremely low load range.

Since the OX66 can secure a sufficient valve area by adopting five valves, it has a short-stroke configuration to secure output in the high rpm range with φ85.07X58.5 mm, but avoids flattening of the combustion chamber. The engine has a high output and a very wide power band by stabilizing combustion on both the high and low revs.

The intake valve has a larger diameter than the exhaust valve, so it is heavier. Therefore, by increasing the number of intake valves, the inertial mass of the entire intake valve is reduced to reduce the valve drive output.

The three intake valves are not aligned and the central valve is closer to the end. However, he said that all three extension lines of the valve stem pass through the center line of the camshaft, and all the valves are opened and closed directly by the camshaft.

Racing history
Yamaha was scheduled to participate only in the All Japan F2 Championship at the time of the announcement but changed its policy to participate in the Fuji Grand Champion Race (Fuji GC) as well. Since commercialization is a prerequisite for participating in the GC, it was necessary to commercialize it from 1986.

In the GC, the installation of a muffler is required by the rule, so its development was necessary. Regarding the muffler, it became necessary to even in F2 from 1985. The muffler was installed at the outlet of the exhaust pipe for each bank.

The actual race participation was limited supply in 1985 for engine development, and from 1986 it was supplied in the form of the rental to those who wished.

1985
In 1985, a limited supply of Geoff Lees (F2/GC all rounds) and Keiji Matsumoto (from F2 Round 3) was implemented.

In F2, Reese is up to third in the March 85J, sixth in the championship, and Matsumoto is up to second.

At the GC, Reese was ranked fifth in the MCS-VI / March 842 and seventh in the championship, and was judged to have the same performance as Honda, so it was commercialized in 1986.

1986
In the 1986 series, Yamaha leased the supply of OX66 to the team and carried out maintenance with a designated tuner. Used by 9 people in GC/11 people in F2.

As the number of users increases, maintenance cannot be done with Matsuura RS alone, so Tomei Engine and Ogawa Motor are also in charge of maintenance.

Geoff Lees won the second round of the GC, Keiji Matsumoto won the third round of the GC, and finally, Reese became the champion.

In F2, he won a total of four races, but he couldn't win the championship.

However, it was found that the overhaul cost of OX66 would be two to three times that of the conventional BMW, and the team negotiated with Yamaha to reduce the price, but Yamaha rejected this request. Therefore, the team side has been requesting to change F2 to F3000 from next year, and a three-way talk between JAF/team/competition organizer was held. The JAF insisted that F2 be continued for four years (until 1988), but the team and the competition organizers strongly requested the transition to F3000, which can reduce the cost of participation. As a result, in 1987, F2 was changed to F3000 ( All Japan F3000 Championship ), and F3000 was excluded from the All Japan Championship under the supervision of JAF in 1987.

1987
In 1987, Aguri Suzuki and Kaoru Iida participated in the GC at Yamaha. Since the GC also shares the engine with F2, we will keep an eye on the situation regarding the transition from F2 to F3000 and balance the F2 and F3000 engines (difference in minimum vehicle weight) in the direction of balancing according to the vehicle regulations. I was looking for it.

Ultimately, the OX66-equipped vehicle weighs a minimum of 560 kg, which is 10 kg heavier than last year, but the F3000 engine-equipped vehicle weighs 610 kg and is equipped with a 9000 rpm rev limiter. Volume restrictions have been tightened for all vehicles. (From 115db to 110db)

Suzuki decided that he could compete with the F3000 engine-equipped car with a lightweight, but the power of the F3000 engine-equipped car was so great that he could not win the championship, but the highest ranking in terms of results was fourth in qualifying / third in the final. He achieved a good result in third place in the series.

References

Yamaha products
Formula Two
Engines by model
Gasoline engines by model
V6 engines